Luís Filipe Palma Barroso (born 27 January 1966) is a Portuguese sprinter. He competed in the men's 100 metres at the 1984 Summer Olympics.

References

1966 births
Living people
Athletes (track and field) at the 1984 Summer Olympics
Athletes (track and field) at the 1988 Summer Olympics
Athletes (track and field) at the 1992 Summer Olympics
Portuguese male sprinters
Olympic athletes of Portugal
Place of birth missing (living people)